Northwest Angle Airport  is a privately owned, private-use airport located in Angle Inlet, a township in Lake of the Woods County, Minnesota, United States. It is the northernmost airport in the contiguous United States.

Facilities and aircraft
Northwest Angle Airport covers an area of 18 acres which contains a runway designated 8/26 with a 2,380 x 105 ft (715 x 32 m) turf surface. For the 12-month period ending August 3, 1979, the airport had 400 aircraft operations, an average of 33 per month: 100% general aviation. At that time there weren't any aircraft based at this airport.

History 
The airport was built as part of a resort in 1965 by Norman Carlson.  In 1995 the airport was closed to public use due to liability concerns.  In 2012 a preliminary airport feasibility study was conducted to determine whether there was demand for a new public airport.  A second airport feasibility study identified six possible sites for a public airport including the existing airport. Three potential sites were found potentially economically, aeronautically, and environmentally feasible. A third airport feasibility study completed additional tasks to refine estimated costs for a proposed airport.

Lake of the Woods County Commissioners on June 16, 2015 selected a site one to 1.5 miles southeast of downtown Angle Inlet to build a new airport that will open the remote area of northern Minnesota to general aviation.  The airport feasibility studies refer to this location as site 3.

References

External links

Airports in Minnesota
Buildings and structures in Lake of the Woods County, Minnesota
Transportation in Lake of the Woods County, Minnesota